Donohue Pass is a high mountain pass on the boundary between Yosemite National Park and the Ansel Adams Wilderness. It is situated between Mount Lyell and Donohue Peak. The John Muir Trail and the Pacific Crest Trail both transverse the pass. Donohue Pass is the sixth highest pass of the ten named passes on the John Muir Trail.

The pass and Donohue Peak were named in 1895 for Sergeant Donohue, Troop K, 4th Cavalry who made the first ascent of the peak.

References

External links
 

Landforms of Yosemite National Park
Landforms of Tuolumne County, California
Landforms of Mono County, California
Mountain passes on the John Muir Trail